The 2016 Norwich City Council election took place on 5 May 2016 to elect members of Norwich City Council in England. This was on the same day as other local elections. The Labour Party increased their majority at the expense of the Green Party, capturing 4 previously Green-held seats; the Greens retained only Thorpe Hamlet ward, by a margin of 31 votes.

The Labour Party achieved its best result in the city since 1998, winning 44% of the vote and 11 of 13 seats up for election, with the Greens dropping to their worst percentage result since 2005. UKIP achieved its best-ever result in the city, at 10.5%.

The scale of the Labour victory was reported to have surprised both Labour and the Green Party and was partly attributed to Jeremy Corbyn's leadership of the Labour Party bringing "some voters who had previously switched to the Greens back to Labour".

All changes in vote share are calculated with reference to the 2012 election, the last time these seats were contested.

Overall result

|-bgcolor=#F6F6F6
| colspan=2 style="text-align: right; margin-right: 1em" | Total
| style="text-align: right;" | 13
| colspan=4 style="text-align: right;" |Turnout
| style="text-align: right;" | 36.25
| style="text-align: right;" |  35,082
| style="text-align: right;" | 
|-
|}

Changes in vote share are relative to the last time these seats were contested in 2012.

Council Composition

Prior to the election the composition of the council was:

After the election, the composition of the council was:

Ward Results

Bowthorpe

Catton Grove

Crome

Eaton

Lakenham

Mancroft

Mile Cross

Nelson

Sewell

Thorpe Hamlet

Town Close

University

Wensum

References

2016 English local elections
2016
2010s in Norfolk